A Game of Wits is a 1917 American silent comedy-drama film directed by Henry King and starring Gail Kane, George Periolat, and Spottiswoode Aitken.

Cast
 Gail Kane as Jeannette Browning 
 George Periolat as Cyrus Browning 
 Spottiswoode Aitken as Silas Stone 
 Lew Cody as Larry Caldwell

References

Bibliography
 Donald W. McCaffrey & Christopher P. Jacobs. Guide to the Silent Years of American Cinema. Greenwood Publishing, 1999.

External links

1917 films
1917 comedy-drama films
Films directed by Henry King
American silent feature films
1910s English-language films
American black-and-white films
1910s American films
Silent American comedy-drama films